The Transatlantic Policy Consortium (TPC) is a network of 42 United States and European higher education institutions that conduct education, training, and research in the field of public policy and public administration. Its mission is to promote an ongoing dialogue of students and faculty and to conduct joint research on contemporary transatlantic public policy issues. Papers written for the consortium's colloquia are published in the Transatlantic Public Policy Series with LIT Publishers in Germany. Current co-chairmen are professors Charles F. Bonser of Indiana University School of Public and Environmental Affairs and Eberhard Bohne of the German University of Administrative Sciences Speyer.

History
The consortium developed out of colloquia on transatlantic public policy issues jointly sponsored by Indiana University School of Public and Environmental Affairs and École Nationale d'Administration since 1997. It was formally established in May 2000, and has been a grant recipient of the Bosch Foundation since 2008.

Members

California
 Middlebury Institute of International Studies at Monterey
 USC Price School of Public Policy
Georgia
 University of Georgia School of Public and International Affairs
Indiana
 Indiana University Maurer School of Law
 Indiana University School of Public and Environmental Affairs
Maryland
 University of Maryland School of Public Policy
Massachusetts
 Suffolk University Law School
New Jersey
 Rutgers University School of Public Affairs and Administration
New York
 Robert F. Wagner Graduate School of Public Service
 Maxwell School of Citizenship and Public Affairs
 Rockefeller College of Public Affairs & Policy
Pennsylvania
 University of Pittsburgh Graduate School of Public and International Affairs
Texas
 Lyndon B. Johnson School of Public Affairs
Virginia
 George Mason University School of Public Policy
Washington, D.C.
 American University School of Public Affairs

European Union

 Katholieke Universiteit Leuven

 Danish School of Public Administration

 École Nationale d'Administration
 Paris-Sorbonne University
 University of Reims Champagne-Ardenne

 Federal Academy of Public Administration (Associate Member)
 German Research Institute for Public Administration Speyer
 German University of Administrative Sciences Speyer
 Hertie School of Governance
 Karlsruhe Institute for Technology Assessment and Systems Analysis
 Max Planck Institute of Economics
 Potsdam University
 University of Bremen
 Willy Brandt School of Public Policy
 Zeppelin University

 Delft University
 Delft University of Technology
 Erasmus University Rotterdam
 Leiden University
 Tilburg University
 Utrecht University

 The Polish Institute of International Affairs

 Instituto Superior Técnico

 King Juan Carlos University
 Pompeu Fabra University

 Jönköping University

 University of Birmingham
 University of Glasgow

References

External links
 Transatlantic Policy Consortium

Public administration schools
Public policy research
Public policy schools